Little London is a community in Westmoreland Parish, Jamaica. It sits midway between the town of Negril to the north and the Parish Capital Savanna-la-Mar to the south.

Little London is a large community, and within it there are many other small districts including Rattadam (also known as Grant Bush), New Hope, Mango Hall, Old Hope, Broughton, Bay Road, Lodge, McNeil Land and Collie Town.

Based on the latest census, Little London has close to 10,000 residents and is growing rapidly due to the close proximity to the two major towns. Over the last couple of years an influx of people have settled there looking for jobs in Negril.

Little London has a high school, primary school,  infant school, health centre, police station, and post office. Electricity, piped water, telephone services are available throughout the community.

References

Populated places in Westmoreland Parish